Silviella is a genus of flowering plants belonging to the family Orobanchaceae.

It is native to Mexico.

The genus name of Silviella is in honour of Baltasar da Silva Lisboa (1761–1840), a Brazilian lawyer and natural historian. 
It was first described and published in Proc. Acad. Nat. Sci. Philadelphia Vol.80 on page 434 in 1928.

Known species
According to Kew:
Silviella prostrata 
Silviella serpyllifolia

References

Orobanchaceae
Orobanchaceae genera
Plants described in 1928
Flora of Mexico